Third Avenue is the debut studio album by British rapper Fredo. It was released on 1 February 2019 through RCA Records.

Track listing

Charts

Certifications

References

2019 debut albums
RCA Records albums
Fredo (rapper) albums